The Spice AK93 was a sports prototype race car, designed, developed, and built by British manufacturer Spice Engineering, for sports car racing, specifically the newly codified World Sports Car regulations, in 1993.

References

Sports prototypes
Le Mans Prototypes